Tanya Bogomilova Dangalakova (born 30 June 1964) is a former breaststroke swimmer from Bulgaria, who won the gold medal in the 100 m breaststroke at the 1988 Summer Olympics in Seoul, South Korea.

At the 1985 European Aquatics Championships she prevented East Germany from sweeping all women's events for the third European Championships in a row, by winning the 200 meter breaststroke by 0.45 seconds.

References
 

1964 births
Living people
Bulgarian female swimmers
Female breaststroke swimmers
Olympic swimmers of Bulgaria
Olympic gold medalists for Bulgaria
Swimmers at the 1980 Summer Olympics
Swimmers at the 1988 Summer Olympics
World Aquatics Championships medalists in swimming
European Aquatics Championships medalists in swimming

Medalists at the 1988 Summer Olympics
Olympic gold medalists in swimming
Sportspeople from Sofia
Universiade medalists in swimming
Universiade gold medalists for Bulgaria
Universiade bronze medalists for Bulgaria
Medalists at the 1985 Summer Universiade